Douglas Michael Waechter (born January 28, 1981) is an American former professional baseball pitcher for the Tampa Bay Devil Rays, Florida Marlins and Kansas City Royals of Major League Baseball. He graduated from Northeast High School and was then drafted by the Devil Rays in the 3rd round of the 1999 Major League Baseball Draft. During his minor league career he threw a no-hitter when he was with the Single-A short season club, the Hudson Valley Renegades. Since making his major league debut in 2003, he was shuffled back and forth between Triple-A Durham and Tampa Bay, making 54 starts with the Devil Rays.

In his first major league start at home, and second overall, on September 3, 2003 against the Seattle Mariners, he threw a 2-hit complete game shutout, which would remain the best single-game performance of his career.  Over four seasons with the Devil Rays, from 2003 through 2006, he was 14-25 with a 5.62 ERA.

After having shoulder surgery in October 2006, he was released by the team on November 22. He then made a comeback with the D-Rays, being put on the 60-day DL. His season has compiled of two rehab starts with the Hudson Valley Renegades, Tampa Bay's single A short season affiliate. His rehab starts were against the Staten Island Yankees, the New York Yankees affiliate, and the Brooklyn Cyclones, the New York Mets affiliate. He has compiled a 1-1 record giving up three runs in the two rehab starts.

During the 2007 offseason, he was signed to a minor league contract by the Florida Marlins. After spring training, he was assigned to the Triple-A Albuquerque Isotopes.  His contract was purchased on April 18, 2008, and he was promoted to the Marlins as a relief pitcher.  In 2007, he had arguably his most successful major league season as a relief pitcher, appearing in 48 games for Florida with a 4-2 record and a 3.69 ERA.  Having played most of his career in the American League, with the National League Marlins, he got the only hit of his major league career on June 6, 2008 against the Cincinnati Reds.  The Marlins, however, parted ways with him after the season, granting him his free agency on October 1, 2008.

On December 11, 2008, Waechter signed a one-year deal with the Kansas City Royals.  He pitched for Kansas City during the 2009 season and appeared in only 5 games as a relief pitcher with a 0-0 record and an 8.77 ERA.  He was released on November 21, 2009, and became a free agent.  After failing to draw interest from any major league clubs in 2010 or 2011, he announced his retirement on June 25, 2011.

For his six-year major league career, he finished with 18 wins and 27 losses, in 113 appearances, including 54 starts with one complete game shutout and a career ERA of 5.34.

Waechter has occasionally appeared as a sportscaster alongside Dewayne Staats covering Rays games for Bally Sports Sun (formerly Fox Sports Sun). He also serves as a realtor for DMK Group at Douglas Elliman Real Estate.

References

External links

Minor League Baseball-reference.com page for Waechter

1981 births
Living people
Baseball players from Florida
Major League Baseball pitchers
Hudson Valley Renegades players
Tampa Bay Devil Rays players
Florida Marlins players
Kansas City Royals players
Princeton Devil Rays players
Charleston RiverDogs players
Orlando Rays players
Bakersfield Blaze players
Durham Bulls players
Vero Beach Devil Rays players
Albuquerque Isotopes players
Gulf Coast Marlins players
Jupiter Hammerheads players
Omaha Royals players
Indios de Mayagüez players
American television sports announcers
Major League Baseball broadcasters
Tampa Bay Rays announcers
American real estate brokers